Pseudacontia is a genus of moths of the family Noctuidae.

Species
 Pseudacontia cansa J.B. Smith, 1908
 Pseudacontia crustaria (Morrison, 1875)
 Pseudacontia louisa J.B. Smith, 1908

References
Natural History Museum Lepidoptera genus database
Pseudacontia at funet

Cuculliinae